Lec or LEC may refer to:

Organisations
 Lake Erie College, a college in Painesville, Ohio
 Lancaster Environment Centre, an interdisciplinary centre at Lancaster University, England

 Lao Evangelical Church, a religious body in Laos
 Laredo Entertainment Center, a sports arena in Laredo, Texas, US
 LEC Refrigeration, former British white goods manufacturer now part of Glen Dimplex
 LEC Refrigeration Racing, British Formula One constructor associated with the company
 Little East Conference, an NCAA Division III collegiate athletic conference based in New England, US
 Living Enrichment Center, a defunct New Thought church in Wilsonville, Oregon, US
 Lonsdale Energy Corp, a centralized heating operation owned by North Vancouver, British Columbia
 LucasArts Entertainment Company, the former videogame division of Lucasfilm

Places
 Lec, former name of the city of Giżycko, Poland 
 LEC, Amtrak station code for Lake City (Amtrak station) in Florida, US

Science and technology
 Light emitting capacitor, an electroluminescent panel
 Light Emitting Ceramic, a particular brand of ceramic discharge metal-halide lamp
 Light-emitting electrochemical cell, a solid-state device that generates light from an electric current
 Line echo cancellation, a method to cancel or suppress echoes in an electrical signal
 Liquid encapsulated Czochralski, a variant of the Czochralski process for growing crystals
 Liver-expressed chemokine, a small chemokine also known as CCL16
 Local exchange carrier, a type of telecommunication service provider
 Lunar Equipment Conveyor, a device used on Apollo program missions to ferry equipment and samples in and out of the Lunar Module
 Lymphoid endothelial cell - formed in lymphangiogenesis

Other uses
 Legal Education Certificate, a professional certification allowing its holder to practice law in the Commonwealth Caribbean
 Levelised energy cost, the average whole-lifetime cost of electricity from a power plant
 Levy Exemption Certificate, issued to some emitters under the UK Climate Change Levy
 Local enterprise company, a type of government-owned economic development organization in Scotland
 Lee–Enfield Cavalry Carbine Mk I, a British rifle
 Logic equivalence checking, alternate name for Formal equivalence checking, a process in electronic design automation
 League of Legends EMEA Championship (LEC), formerly "League of Legends European Championship" (LEC) and "Europe League Championship Series" (EU LCS), Europe's top professional league in League of Legends

See also
 Stanisław Jerzy Lec (1909–1966), Polish aphorist
 Stari Lec, a village in Serbia
 Lech (disambiguation)
 Leck (disambiguation)
 Lek (disambiguation)